The North Ossetian Autonomous Soviet Socialist Republic was an autonomous republic of the Russian SFSR within the Soviet Union.

History 
It existed from 5 December 1936 until 9 November 1993 when it became the Republic of North Ossetia (since 1994 the Republic of North Ossetia-Alania), a federal subject of Russia.

In 1990 the North Ossetian ASSR declared itself independent as part of rising ethnic conflict with Ingushetia. Originally part of the Ingush territory was transferred to North Ossetia in 1944, bringing with it thousands of Ingush people, and with the dissolution of the Soviet Union conflicts began.

During the summer and early autumn of 1992, there was a steady increase in the militancy of Ingush nationalists. At the same time, there was a steady increase in incidents of organized harassment, kidnapping and rape against Ingush inhabitants of North Ossetia by their Ossetian neighbors, police, security forces, and militia. This would eventually lead to the Ossetian–Ingush Conflict.

See also
First Secretary of the North Ossetian Communist Party

References

External links
A People Reborn: The Story of North Ossetia, 1954.

Autonomous republics of the Russian Soviet Federative Socialist Republic
North Ossetia–Alania
States and territories established in 1936
1936 establishments in the Soviet Union
1993 disestablishments in Russia
States and territories disestablished in 1993

Former socialist republics